Jade Helena Brooks is an author and advocate known for her autobiography The Teen Sex Trade: My Story. Her activism work centres around helping sexually exploited youth and raising awareness.

Career 
Following her exit from the sex industry in 2011, Brooks began working with an agency in Toronto to help other victims of the sexual exploitation. She helped to create The Stages of Sexual Exploitation, a tool to help identify if someone is being sexually exploited.

Her first book, The Teen Sex Trade: My Story, was published in September 2017. She self-published a follow up book, Renegade: Teen Sex Trade Part Two.

In 2019, Brooks was featured at Pictou County's symposium on human trafficking. Brooks helped to develop a module of online program, Supporting Survivors of Sexual Violence: A Nova Scotia Resource, focussed on the exploitation of children and youth in 2021.

Books 

 The Teen Sex Trade: My Story (2017)
 Renegade: Teen Sex Trade Part Two (2021)

Personal life 
Brooks has four siblings. She was born in Toronto and grew up in the Uniacke Square area of Halifax, Nova Scotia. At age 11, she was placed into the Nova Scotia foster care system. Brooks met the man who would become her boyfriend and, later, trafficker, at age 15. She was trafficked in both Toronto and Montreal. Brooks was able to exit trafficking and the sex trade at age 19.

References 

21st-century Canadian women writers
Writers from Halifax, Nova Scotia
Writers from Toronto
Victims of underage prostitution
Living people
Canadian women activists
Anti–human trafficking activists
Black Nova Scotians
Black Canadian writers
Black Canadian women
Canadian women memoirists
Canadian memoirists
1992 births